Kemmer is a surname. Notable people with the surname include:

 Bill Kemmer (1873–1945), American baseball player
 Ed Kemmer (1921–2004), American actor
 Heike Kemmer (born 1962), German equestrian
 Herbert Kemmer (1905–1962), German field hockey player
 Jean-Pierre Kemmer (1923–1991), Luxembourgian composer and conductor
 Mariette Kemmer (born 1953), Luxembourgian opera singer
 Nicholas Kemmer (1911–1998), Russian-born British physicist
 Ronja Kemmer (born 1989), German politician

See also
 Kemer (disambiguation)
 Kemmerer (disambiguation)